The Ygyatta (Igıatta) is river in Sakha, Russia. It is a left tributary of the Vilyuy. The depth of the river at its mouth is near . It rises on the Vilyuy Plateau in the west of Sakha and is fed by rain and snowmelt.

The river and its banks are rich with gems: emeralds, rubies, sards, aquamarines, and others.

There are goldfields along the river.

The basin of the Ygyatta is among the least populated places within Russia.

See also
List of rivers of Russia

References

External links
 Ygyatta from space

Rivers of the Sakha Republic